Emma Ruth Rundle (born October 10, 1983) is an American singer-songwriter, guitarist and visual artist based in Portland, Oregon. Formerly of the Nocturnes and Marriages, she has released five solo albums and is a member of Red Sparowes.

Early life and career
Rundle was born in Santa Monica, California and moved “back and forth between the Westside and Eastside” when she was growing up before attending Eagle Rock High School. She was raised in Los Angeles with her younger sister in a household where a lot of folk music was played. As a teenager, Rundle lived with her grandmother until the end of her life.

After a massive earthquake in her hometown, her mother took her into the legendary folk music store McCabe's and told her she could pick one instrument to rent for lessons. She initially chose the Celtic harp before switching to guitar, and later went on to work at McCabe's for 13 years.

With her first band, the Nocturnes, she released the Wellington EP (2008) and two albums, A Year of Spring (2009) and Aokigahara (2011). Rundle also joined Red Sparowes and played on their third album, The Fear Is Excruciating, But Therein Lies the Answer, released by Sargent House on April 6, 2010.

She self-released an ambient guitar album, Electric Guitar: One, in 2011. It was later reissued in 2014 by Errant Child Recordings.

In 2012, she formed the trio Marriages, who have released the Kitsune EP (2012) and Salome full-length (2015).

On January 7, 2013, she self-released the album Somnambulant, attributed to The Headless Prince of Zolpidem, which she described as "my somewhat anonymous downtempo, somewhat creepy electronic dark wave project".

Rundle's second solo work, Some Heavy Ocean, was released on May 20, 2014 by Sargent House. It was co-produced by Chris Common and recorded at the Sargent House studio. Rundle lived at the studio complex as an artist-in-residence for the period. The release was accompanied by a US tour with King Buzzo.

Rundle suffers from adenomyosis, which in part inspired the material on her third album, Marked for Death, produced by Sonny DiPerri. It was released in October 2016 on Sargent House.

In January 2017, a split EP with Jaye Jayle, titled The Time Between Us, was announced, and the song "The Distance" was made available on streaming platforms. The EP was released by Sargent House on February 24.

Rundle's fourth studio album, On Dark Horses, was released on September 14, 2018. It featured contributions by Jaye Jayle members Evan Patterson and Todd Cook as well as Dylan Nadon. Also in 2018, Rundle provided backing vocals for "Just Breathe", a song on American rock band Thrice's 2018 album Palms.

In August 2019, Roadburn Festival announced that Rundle was one of two curators for the 2020 edition.

In October 2020, she released a collaboration album with Thou, May Our Chambers Be Full.

After a week-long stay in a mental health hospital helped her get sober from drugs and alcohol, she released her fifth studio solo album, Engine of Hell, in November 2021, to positive critical reception.

Personal life 
Rundle struggled with drug addiction from the age of 12. 
 
She was married to Jaye Jayle co-founder Evan Patterson. They lived in Louisville, Kentucky. Their divorce was finalized in August 2021.

She is a fan of anime.

Discography

Solo
Electric Guitar: One (2011, Self-Released)
Some Heavy Ocean (2014, Sargent House)
Marked For Death (2016, Sargent House)
The Time Between Us EP Split With Jaye Jayle (2017, Sargent House)
On Dark Horses (2018, Sargent House)
 May Our Chambers Be Full / The Helm Of Sorrow Collaborative Album With Thou (2020, Sacred Bones)
Engine of Hell (2021, Sargent House)
EG2: Dowsing Voice (2022, Sargent House)

With The Nocturnes
Wellington EP (2008, Self-Released)
A Year of Spring (2009, Self-Released)
Aokigahara (2011, The Errant Child)

With Red Sparowes
The Fear Is Excruciating, But Therein Lies the Answer (2010, Sargent House)

With Marriages
Kitsune EP (2012, Sargent House)
Salome (2015, Sargent House)

As The Headless Prince Of Zolpidem
Somnambulant (2013, Self-Released)

References

External links
 
 

Living people
American women singer-songwriters
1983 births
21st-century American singers
21st-century American guitarists
21st-century American women singers
Guitarists from Los Angeles
Singers from Los Angeles
21st-century American women guitarists
Singer-songwriters from California